Underdog is an American Saturday morning animated television series that ran from October 3, 1964, to March 4, 1967 starting on the NBC network until 1966, with the rest of the run on CBS, under the primary sponsorship of General Mills, for a run of 62 episodes. It is one of the early Saturday morning cartoons. The show continued in syndication until 1973.

Underdog, Shoeshine Boy's heroic alter ego, appears whenever love interest Sweet Polly Purebred is being victimized by such villains as Simon Bar Sinister or Riff Raff. Underdog nearly always speaks in rhyming couplets, as in "There's no need to fear, Underdog is here!" His voice was supplied by Wally Cox.

History
In 1959, handling the General Mills account as an account executive with the Dancer Fitzgerald Sample advertising agency in New York, W. Watts Biggers teamed with Chet Stover, Treadwell D. Covington, and artist Joe Harris in the creation of television cartoon shows to sell breakfast cereals for General Mills. The shows introduced such characters as King Leonardo, Tennessee Tuxedo, and Underdog. Biggers and Stover contributed both scripts and songs to the series. When Underdog became a success, Biggers and his partners left Dancer Fitzgerald Sample to form their own company, Total Television, with animation produced at Gamma Studios in Mexico. In 1969, Total Television folded when General Mills dropped out as the primary sponsor, but continued to retain the rights to the series until 1995 and TV distribution rights, through NBCUniversal Television Distribution, to the present day.

Abroad and in syndication
The syndicated version of The Underdog Show consists of 62 half-hour episodes.  The supporting segments differ from the show's original network run.  The first 26 syndicated episodes feature Tennessee Tuxedo as a supporting segment.  (Tennessee Tuxedo originally aired as a separate show and also has its own syndicated adaptation.)  Thereafter, for most of the balance of the package, the middle segments include Go Go Gophers and Klondike Kat for three consecutive half-hours and Tennessee Tuxedo in the fourth.  Commander McBragg is featured in the majority of episodes, replaced by three segments of The Sing-A-Long Family (in shows one-three, 28–30, and 55–57).  The final two syndicated Underdog half-hours feature two one-shot cartoons that were originally part of an unsold pilot for a projected 1966 series, The Champion (Cauliflower Cabbie and Gene Hattree), with Commander McBragg appearing in show 61 and Go Go Gophers in show 62.

The syndicated series, as shown in the United States, is a potpourri of segments from previously aired versions of the show. Prior to a 1994 remaster, each episode included a "teaser" at the top of the show, asking viewers to stay tuned for a clip from "today's four-part story." (This originates from a 1969–1973 NBC Saturday morning rerun version of the show.) However, never more than two parts of the Underdog stories were ever shown in any half-hour program. Prints of such would either be followed by a closing and credits or no credits at all. The closing (which showed the first portion of a variation of the Underdog theme showing a giant terrorizing the city with George S. Irving, the series narrator, saying, "Looks like this is the end! But don't miss our next Underdog Show!" in place of the theme music) followed by the end credits (re-edited from the cast credits for Underdog and Tennessee Tuxedo), originated from a 1965 repackaged syndicated series, Cartoon Cut-Ups, which originally featured Underdog, Tennessee Tuxedo, and Commander McBragg.

For many years starting with NBC's last run in the mid-1970s, all references to Underdog swallowing his Super Energy Pill were censored, most likely out of fear that kids would see medication that looked like the Underdog pills (red with a white "U" on them) and swallow them.  Two instances that did not actually show Underdog swallowing the pills remained in the show. In one, he drops pills into water supplies; in the other, his ring is damaged and he explains that it is where he keeps the pill—but the part where he actually swallows it was still deleted.

Most stories had multiple parts, but the first four were stand-alones:
 "Safe Waif", the pilot, featured a rescue from a bank vault, but no villain. Underdog is shown causing major destruction while trying to help people.
 "March of the Monsters", the first appearance of Sweet Polly Purebred, has giant robots running amok.
 "Simon Says" is the first appearance of Simon Bar Sinister. "Simon says HOLD IT!" is the maniacal refrain, as Bar Sinister uses a weird camera to turn his victims into full-sized, two-dimensional photographs.
 "Tricky Trap by Tap Tap" is the epilogue to the multi-part story "From Hopeless to Helpless" featuring Riff Raff.

Reruns of the show aired on Nickelodeon from 1992 to 1994, Cartoon Network from 1996 to 1999, and on Boomerang from 2002 to 2007. However during its broadcasting on Cartoon Network and Boomerang, two notable episodes, "The Molemen" and "A New Villain", were not included on the channels’ schedule due to depicted dangerous elements subjected within the segments.

In 1995, Biggers, Stover, Covington, and Harris (with General Mills) negotiated a sale of their creations to Saturday Night Live producer Lorne Michaels' Broadway Video, who later sold the rights to Golden Books. When Classic Media took over Golden Books, it acquired the underlying rights to Underdog. In 2012, Classic Media was sold to DreamWorks Animation, and ultimately became the property of the series' current owners, Universal Television.   TV Guide ranked Underdog  as number 23 on its "50 Greatest Cartoon Characters of All Time" list, IGN ranked it as number 74 on its Best 100 Animated Series list.

Characters

Underdog is a anthropomorphic dog superhero. The premise was that "humble and lovable" Shoeshine Boy was in truth the superhero Underdog. George S. Irving narrated and comedy actor Wally Cox provided the voices of both Underdog and Shoeshine Boy. When villains threatened, Shoeshine Boy ducked into a telephone booth, where he transformed into the caped and costumed hero, destroying the booth in the process when his superpowers were activated. Underdog almost always spoke in rhyme:

"When Polly's in trouble (or When help is needed), I am not slow,
It's hip-hip-hip and AWAY I GO!"

Underdog's most frequent saying when he appeared was:

"There's no need to fear—
Underdog is here!"

The majority of episodes used a common template as the final scene. A crowd of people looking up into the sky would say, "Look in the sky!" "It's a plane!" "It's a bird!" After this, a woman wearing glasses would exclaim, "It's a frog!" Another onlooker would respond, "A frog?" To this, Underdog replied with these words:

"Not plane, nor bird, nor even frog,
It's just little old me ... [at this point, Underdog would crash into something, then sheepishly finish] "Heh-heh-heh. Underdog."

Underdog usually caused collateral damage. Whenever someone complained about the damage, Underdog replied:

"I am a hero who never fails;
I cannot be bothered with such details."

The villains almost always managed to menace Sweet Polly Purebred (voiced by Norma MacMillan), an anthropomorphic canine TV reporter, as part of their nefarious schemes; she was a helpless damsel in distress most of the time and had a habit of singing, "Oh, where, oh, where has my Underdog gone? Oh, where, oh, where can he be?" She would sing this to the music of the song "Oh Where Has My Little Dog Gone" whenever in jeopardy. Recurring villains included:
 Simon Bar Sinister, voiced by Allen Swift, is a mad scientist with a voice reminiscent of Lionel Barrymore. He is the wickedest man in the world and has an assistant named Cad Lackey. A bar sinister is a diagonal line, running from top right to bottom left on medieval family coats of arms, a symbol that indicates the person is a bastard by birth; this was an inside joke typical of animation writing at the time.
 Riff Raff, also voiced by Allen Swift, is an anthropomorphic wolf gangster based on noted actor George Raft. His right-hand man is Mooch, while other gang members (seen in one episode each) include Sandy the Safecracker, Spinny Wheels (who drives the gang's getaway car), Dinah Mite (the underworld's greatest bomb tosser), Nails the Carpenter, Needles the Tailor, Smitty the Blacksmith, and the Witch Doctor.

Other villains included The Electric Eel (a.k.a. Slippery Eel), Battyman, Tap Tap the Chisler (an evil look-alike of Underdog who does not speak in rhyme), and Overcat. Underdog also regularly faced enemies from alien worlds, such as the Marbleheads from the planet Granite, the Magnet Men of the Magnet Planet, the aliens from the planet Zot, and the Flying Sorcerers of the Saucer Planet.

The majority of the Underdog adventures were presented in the form of four-part serial episodes. Other cartoons, including Go Go Gophers and The Hunter, filled the middle segments. A 1969–1973 NBC run featured all four parts of an Underdog storyline in one half-hour show. The series was first syndicated in the U.S. in the mid-1960s under the title Cartoon Cut-Ups, which presented two Underdog segments along with Tennessee Tuxedo and His Tales and The World of Commander McBragg. This package was revised in the 1970s under the Underdog Show title, now including all 124 Underdog segments and featuring Tennessee Tuxedo, Commander McBragg, Go Go Gophers, and Klondike Kat in various episodes. A syndicated package prepared for distribution outside the United States (which also aired on the Boomerang cable network) usually featured two brief Underdog episodes in a single show along with a wider variety of other Total TV cartoon shorts which appeared  between such segments: Go Go Gophers, The King and Odie, Klondike Kat, Tennessee Tuxedo, The Hunter, Tooter Turtle, and Commander McBragg.

On these interstitial cartoons,  Tennessee Tuxedo, a penguin, was accompanied by two friends, slow-witted walrus Chumley and Professor Phineas J. Whoopie, "the Man With All The Answers". Tennessee Tuxedo was voiced by Don Adams of Get Smart (and later Inspector Gadget) fame; the knowledgeable Professor Phineas J. Whoopee was voiced by Larry Storch of F Troop fame.

Episodes
Episode 301
 Underdog #1 (Episode 1: Safe Waif) (pilot cartoon; no on-screen title shown)
 Tennessee Tuxedo #2 (The Rain Makers) (902, 972)
 The Sing-A-Long Family #1 (Picnic) (Sing-A-Long Family cartoon titles are unofficial and do not appear on screen) (also appears in syndicated shows #328, 355)
 Underdog #2 (Episode 2: The March Of The Monsters)

Episode 302
 Underdog #3 (Episode 3: Simon Says)
 Tennessee Tuxedo #4 (Telephone Terrors or Dial M For Mayhem) (904, 974)
 The Sing-A-Long Family #2 (Skating) (also appears in syndicated shows #329, 356)
 Underdog #32 (Episode 4: Tricky Trap By Tap Tap) (Note: Tricky Trap By Tap Tap is the epilogue of the four-episode serial From Hopeless To Helpless, which is featured later in the series in shows #315 and #316.)

Episode 303
 Underdog #4 (Go Snow: Episode 1)
 Tennessee Tuxedo #5 (Giant Clam) (not The Giant Clam Caper) (905, 975)
 The Sing-A-Long Family #3 (Fair) (also appears in syndicated shows #330, 357)
 Underdog #5 (Go Snow: Episode 2)

Episode 304
 Underdog #6 (Go Snow: Episode 3)
 Tennessee Tuxedo #6 (Tick Tock) (906, 976)
 Commander McBragg #4 (The North Pole)
 Underdog #7 (Go Snow: Episode 4)

Episode 305
 Underdog #8 (Zot: Episode 1)
 Tennessee Tuxedo #7 (Scuttled Sculptor) (907, 977)
 Commander McBragg #5 (Khyber Pass)
 Underdog #9 (Zot: Episode 2)

Episode 306
 Underdog #10 (Zot: Episode 3)
 Tennessee Tuxedo #8 (Snap That Picture!) (908, 978)
 Commander McBragg #6 (Ace Of Aces)
 Underdog #11 (Zot: Episode 4)

Episode 307
 Underdog #12 (The Great Gold Robbery: Episode 1)
 Tennessee Tuxedo #9 (Zoo's News) (909, 979)
 Commander McBragg #7 (Niagara Falls)
 Underdog #13 (The Great Gold Robbery: Episode 2)

Episode 308
 Underdog #14 (The Great Gold Robbery: Episode 3)
 Tennessee Tuxedo #10 (Aztec Antics) (910, 980)
 Commander McBragg #8 (Dodge City Dodge)
 Underdog #15 (The Great Gold Robbery: Episode 4)

Episode 309
 Underdog #16 (Fearo: Episode 1)
 Tennessee Tuxedo #11 (Coal Minors) (not Coat Minors) (911, 981)
 Commander McBragg #9 (Football By Tex Hex)
 Underdog #17 (Fearo: Episode 2)

Episode 310
 Underdog #18 (Fearo: Episode 3)
 Tennessee Tuxedo #12 (Hot Air Heroes) (912, 982)
 Commander McBragg #10 (Rabelasia)
 Underdog #19 (Fearo: Episode 4)

Episode 311
 Underdog #20 (The Big Shrink: Episode 1) (not Shrinking Water)
 Tennessee Tuxedo #13 (Irrigation Irritation) (913, 983)
 Commander McBragg #11 (Okefenokee Swamp)
 Underdog #21 (The Big Shrink: Episode 2)

Episode 312
 Underdog #22 (The Big Shrink: Episode 3)
 Tennessee Tuxedo #14 (TV Testers) (914, 984)
 Commander McBragg #12 (The Flying Machine)
 Underdog #23 (The Big Shrink: Episode 4)

Episode 313
 Underdog #24 (The Bubbleheads: Episode 1)
 Tennessee Tuxedo #15 (By The Plight Of The Moon) (915, 985)
 Commander McBragg #13 (The Giant Elephant)
 Underdog #25 (The Bubbleheads: Episode 2)

Episode 314
 Underdog #26 (The Bubbleheads: Episode 3)
 Tennessee Tuxedo #17 (Bridge Builders) (917, 987)
 Commander McBragg #14 (The Great Bird) (not The Giant Bird)
 Underdog #27 (The Bubbleheads: Episode 4)

Episode 315
 Underdog #28 (From Hopeless To Helpless: Episode 1)
 Tennessee Tuxedo #16 (Lever Levity) (916, 986)
 Commander McBragg #15 ("Chicago" Mobster)
 Underdog #29 (From Hopeless To Helpless: Episode 2)

Episode 316
 Underdog #30 (From Hopeless To Helpless: Episode 3)
 Tennessee Tuxedo #18 (Howl, Howl, The Gang's All Here) (918, 988)
 Commander McBragg #16 (The Monster Bear)
 Underdog #31 (From Hopeless To Helpless: Episode 4)

Episode 317
 Underdog #33 (The Witch Of Pickyoon: Episode 1) (not The Wicked Witch Of Pickyoon)
 Tennessee Tuxedo #19 (Sail Ho!) (not Sail On, Sail On) (919, 989)
 Commander McBragg #17 (The Kangaroo)
 Underdog #34 (The Witch Of Pickyoon: Episode 2)

Episode 318
 Underdog #35 (The Witch Of Pickyoon: Episode 3)
 Tennessee Tuxedo #20 (Tell-Tale Telegraph) (920, 990)
 Commander McBragg #18 (The Giant Mosquito)
 Underdog #36 (The Witch Of Pickyoon: Episode 4)

Episode 319
 Underdog #37 (Weathering The Storm: Episode 1)
 Tennessee Tuxedo #21 (Rocket Ruckus) (921, 991)
 Commander McBragg #19 (The Black Knight)
 Underdog #38 (Weathering The Storm: Episode 2)

Episode 320
 Underdog #39 (Weathering The Storm: Episode 3)
 Tennessee Tuxedo #22 (All Steamed Up) (not Getting Steamed Up) (922, 992)
 Commander McBragg #20 (The Flying Pond)
 Underdog #40 (Weathering The Storm: Episode 4)

Episode 321
 Underdog #41 (The Gold Bricks: Episode 1)
 Tennessee Tuxedo #23 (Tale Of A Tiger) (923, 993)
 Commander McBragg #21 (The Old Ninety-Two)
 Underdog #42 (The Gold Bricks: Episode 2)

Episode 322
 Underdog #43 (The Gold Bricks: Episode 3)
 Tennessee Tuxedo #24 (Dog Daze) (Sequel to Tennessee Tuxedo #18/Howl, Howl, The Gang's All Here) (924, 994)
 Commander McBragg #22 (Our Man In Manhattan) (not Secret Agent In New York)
 Underdog #44 (The Gold Bricks: Episode 4)

Episode 323
 Underdog #45 (The Magnet Men: Episode 1)
 Tennessee Tuxedo #25 (Brushing Off A Toothache) (925, 995)
 Commander McBragg #23 (Oyster Island)
 Underdog #46 (The Magnet Men: Episode 2)

Episode 324
 Underdog #47 (The Magnet Men: Episode 3)
 Tennessee Tuxedo #26 (Funny Honey) (926, 996)
 Commander McBragg #24 (The Steam Car)
 Underdog #48 (The Magnet Men: Episode 4)

Episode 325
 Underdog #49 (The Phoney Booths: Episode 1)
 Tennessee Tuxedo #1 (Mixed-Up Mechanics) (901, 971)
 Commander McBragg #25 (Swimming The Atlantic)
 Underdog #50 (The Phoney Booths: Episode 2)

Episode 326
 Underdog #51 (The Phoney Booths: Episode 3)
 Tennessee Tuxedo #3 (The Lamplighters) (903, 973)
 Commander McBragg #26 (Fort Apache)
 Underdog #52 (The Phoney Booths: Episode 4)

Episode 327
 Underdog #53 (Pain Strikes Underdog: Episode 1)
 Go Go Gophers #1 (Moon Zoom)
 Klondike Kat #1 (Honor At Steak)
 Commander McBragg #27 (The Flying Trapeze)
 Underdog #54 (Pain Strikes Underdog: Episode 2)
Episode 328
 Underdog #55 (Pain Strikes Underdog: Episode 3)
 Go Go Gophers #2 (Trojan Totem)
 Klondike Kat #2 (Secret Weapon)
 The Sing-A-Long Family #1 (Picnic) (also appears in syndicated shows #301, 355)
 Underdog #56 (Pain Strikes Underdog: Episode 4)

Episode 329
 Underdog #57 (The Molemen: Episode 1)
 Go Go Gophers #3 (Introducing General Nuisance)
 Klondike Kat #3 (The Big Fromage)
 The Sing-A-Long Family #2 (Skating) (also appears in syndicated shows #302, 356)
 Underdog #58 (The Molemen: Episode 2)

Episode 330
 Underdog #59 (The Molemen: Episode 3)
 Tennessee Tuxedo #27 (The Treasure Of Jack The Joker) (not The Treasure Of Jack And The Joker) (927, 997)
 The Sing-A-Long Family #3 (Fair) (also appears in syndicated shows #303, 357)
 Underdog #60 (The Molemen: Episode 4)

Episode 331
 Underdog #61 (The Flying Sorcerers: Episode 1) (not The Flying Sorceress)
 Go Go Gophers #4 (Gatling Gophers)
 Klondike Kat #4 (Hard To Guard)
 Commander Mc Bragg #31 (Mystifying McBragg)
 Underdog #62 (The Flying Sorcerers: Episode 2)

Episode 332
 Underdog #63 (The Flying Sorcerers: Episode 3)
 Go Go Gophers #5 (The Cleveland Indians)
 Klondike Kat #5 (The Candy Mine)
 Commander Mc Bragg #32 (Mammouth Cavern)
 Underdog #64 (The Flying Sorcerers: Episode 4)

Episode 333
 Underdog #65 (The Forget-Me-Net: Episode 1)
 Go Go Gophers #6 (Medicine Men)
 Klondike Kat #6 (Rotten To The Core)
 Commander Mc Bragg #33 (The Astronaut) (also appears in syndicated show #358)
 Underdog #66 (The Forget-Me-Net: Episode 2)

Episode 334
 Underdog #67 (The Forget-Me-Net: Episode 3)
 Tennessee Tuxedo #28 (Wreck Of A Record) (928, 998)
 Commander Mc Bragg #34 (Dam Break) (also appears in syndicated show #359)
 Underdog #68 (The Forget-Me-Net: Episode 4)

Episode 335
 Underdog #69 (Whistler's Father: Episode 1) (not Guerilla Warfare)
 Go Go Gophers #7 (Mesa Mess)
 Klondike Kat #7 (The Trap Baiting) (not Baiting The Trap)
 Commander Mc Bragg #35 (The Eclipse) (also appears in syndicated show #360)
 Underdog #70 (Whistler's Father: Episode 2)

Episode 336
 Underdog #71 (Whistler's Father: Episode 3)
 Go Go Gophers #8 (Termite Terror) (not Termite Trainers)
 Klondike Kat #8 (Gravy Train)
 Commander Mc Bragg #36 (Ship Of The Desert) (also appears in syndicated show #361)
 Underdog #72 (Whistler's Father: Episode 4)

Episode 337
 Underdog #73 (Simon Says "No Thanksgiving": Episode 1)
 Go Go Gophers #9 (Who's A Dummy)
 Klondike Kat #9 (Cream Puff Buff)
 Commander Mc Bragg #37 (Egypt)
 Underdog #74 (Simon Says "No Thanksgiving": Episode 2)

Episode 338
 Underdog #75 (Simon Says "No Thanksgiving": Episode 3)
 Tennessee Tuxedo #29 (Miner Forty-Niner) (929, 999)
 Commander Mc Bragg #38 (The Singing Cowboy)
 Underdog #76 (Simon Says "No Thanksgiving": Episode 4)

Episode 339
 Underdog #77 (The Silver Thieves: Episode 1)
 Go Go Gophers #10 (Tapping The Telegraph)
 Klondike Kat #10 (Plane Food)
 Commander Mc Bragg #39 (The Lumberjack)
 Underdog #78 (The Silver Thieves: Episode 2)

Episode 340
 Underdog #79 (The Silver Thieves: Episode 3)
 Go Go Gophers #11 (Bold As Gold)
 Klondike Kat #11 (Banana Skinned)
 Commander Mc Bragg #40 (The Bronco Buster)
 Underdog #80 (The Silver Thieves: Episode 4)

Episode 341
 Underdog #81 (Riffraffville: Episode 1)
 Go Go Gophers #12 (Up In The Air)
 Klondike Kat #12 (Up A Tree)
 Commander Mc Bragg #41 (Echo Canyon)
 Underdog #82 (Riffraffville: Episode 2)

Episode 342
 Underdog #83 (Riffraffville: Episode 3)
 Tennessee Tuxedo #30 (Helicopter Hi-Jinks) (930, 1000)
 Commander Mc Bragg #42 (Tightrope)
 Underdog #84 (Riffraffville: Episode 4)

Episode 343
 Underdog #85 (The Tickle Feather Machine: Episode 1)
 Go Go Gophers #13 (The Big Banger)
 Klondike Kat #13 (Pie Fly)
 Commander Mc Bragg #43 (Lake Tortuga)
 Underdog #86 (The Tickle Feather Machine: Episode 2)

Episode 344
 Underdog #87 (The Tickle Feather Machine: Episode 3)
 Go Go Gophers #14 (He's For The Berries)
 Klondike Kat #14 (Jail Break)
 Commander Mc Bragg #44 (Coney Island)
 Underdog #88 (The Tickle Feather Machine: Episode 4)

Episode 345
 Underdog #89 (Underdog Vs. Overcat: Episode 1) (not Underdog Vs. Overcoat)
 Go Go Gophers #15 (Swamped)
 Klondike Kat #15 (Fort Frazzle Frolics)
 Commander Mc Bragg #45 (Rainbow Island)
 Underdog #90 (Underdog Vs. Overcat: Episode 2)

Episode 346
 Underdog #91 (Underdog Vs. Overcat: Episode 3)
 Tennessee Tuxedo #31 (Oil's Well) (931, 1001)
 Commander Mc Bragg #46 (The Insect Collector)
 Underdog #92 (Underdog Vs. Overcat: Episode 4)

Episode 347
 Underdog #93 (The Big Dipper: Episode 1)
 Go Go Gophers #16 (Tanks To The Gophers)
 Klondike Kat #16 (Sticky Stuff)
 Commander Mc Bragg #47 (Lost Valley)
 Tooter Turtle #1 (Nusuiance/Subscribe)
 Underdog #94 (The Big Dipper: Episode 2)

Episode 348
 Underdog #95 (The Big Dipper: Episode 3)
 Go Go Gophers #17 (Indian Treasure)
 Klondike Kat #17 (Who's A Pill)
 Commander Mc Bragg #48 (The Orient Express)
 Underdog #96 (The Big Dipper: Episode 4)

Episode 349
 Underdog #97 (Just In Case: Episode 1)
 Go Go Gophers #18 (The Carriage Trade) (not The Horseless Carriage Trade)
 Klondike Kat #18 (Getting The Air)
 Commander Mc Bragg #1 (Over The Falls)
 Underdog #98 (Just In Case: Episode 2)

Episode 350
 Underdog #99 (Just In Case: Episode 3)
 Tennessee Tuxedo #32 (Parachuting Pickle) (932, 1002)
 Commander Mc Bragg #2 (Fish Story)
 Underdog #100 (Just In Case: Episode 4)

Episode 351
 Underdog #101 (The Marble Heads: Episode 1)
 Go Go Gophers #19 (Honey Fun)
 Klondike Kat #19 (If I'd-A Known You Was Comin‘)
 Commander Mc Bragg #3 (The Himalayas)
 Underdog #102 (The Marble Heads: Episode 2)

Episode 352
 Underdog #103 (The Marble Heads: Episode 3)
 Go Go Gophers #20 (The Colonel Cleans Up)
 Klondike Kat #20 (The Big Race)
 Commander Mc Bragg #28 (Around The World)
 Underdog #104 (The Marble Heads: Episode 4)

Episode 353
 Underdog #105 (Simon Says "Be My Valentine": Episode 1)
 Go Go Gophers #21 (The Raw Recruits)
 Klondike Kat #21 (Date On The Desert)
 Commander Mc Bragg #29 (Indianapolis Speedway)
 Underdog #106 (Simon Says "Be My Valentine": Episode 2)

Episode 354
 Underdog #107 (Simon Says "Be My Valentine": Episode 3)
 Tennessee Tuxedo #33 (Wish Wash) (933, 1003)
 Commander Mc Bragg #30 (The Rhino Charge)
 Underdog #108 (Simon Says "Be My Valentine": Episode 4)

Episode 355
 Underdog #109 (Round And Round: Episode 1)
 Go Go Gophers #22 (Tenshun!)
 Klondike Kat #22 (Klondike Goes To Town)
 The Sing-A-Long Family #1 (Picnic) (also appears in syndicated shows #301, 328)
 Underdog #110 (Round And Round: Episode 2)

Episode 356
 Underdog #111 (Round And Round: Episode 3)
 Go Go Gophers #23 (Cuckoo Combat)
 Klondike Kat #23 (Motorcycle Mountie)
 The Sing-A-Long Family #2 (Skating) (also appears in syndicated shows #302, 329)
 Underdog #112 (Round And Round: Episode 4)

Episode 357
 Underdog #113 (A New Villain: Episode 1)
 Go Go Gophers #24 (Kitchen Capers)
 Klondike Kat #24 (Island In The Sky)
 The Sing-A-Long Family #3 (Fair) (also appears in syndicated shows #303, 330)
 Underdog #114 (A New Villain: Episode 2)

Episode 358
 Underdog #115 (A New Villain: Episode 3)
 Tennessee Tuxedo #34 (Telescope Detectives) (934, 1004)
 Commander McBragg #33 (The Astronaut) (also appears in syndicated show #333)
 Underdog #116 (A New Villain: Episode 4)

Episode 359
 Underdog #117 (Batty-Man: Episode 1)
 Go Go Gophers #25 (The Great White Stallion)
 Klondike Kat #25 (The Island Hideout)
 Commander McBragg #34 (Dam Break) (also appears in syndicated show #334)
 Underdog #118 (Batty-Man: Episode 2)

Episode 360
 Underdog #119 (Batty-Man: Episode 3)
 Go Go Gophers #26 (Blankety-Blank Blanket)
 Klondike Kat #26 (The Kat Napper)
 Commander McBragg #35 (The Eclipse) (also appears in syndicated show #335)
 Underdog #120 (Batty-Man: Episode 4)

Episode 361
 Underdog #121 (The Vacuum Gun: Episode 1)
 Cauliflower Cabbie (Introducing The Champion!)
 Commander McBragg #36 (Ship Of The Desert) (also appears in syndicated show #336)
 Underdog #122 (The Vacuum Gun: Episode 2)

Episode 362
 Underdog #123 (The Vacuum Gun: Episode 3)
 Gene Hattree (The Trap)
 Go Go Gophers #27 (The Ironclad) (not The Unsinkable Iron Clad)
 Underdog #124 (The Vacuum Gun: Episode 4)

Superpowers
When he is not Underdog, he is incognito as Shoeshine Boy. Like Superman, when trouble calls, he hurriedly dresses in a phone booth (which would inexplicably explode upon his conversion). On occasion,  to replenish his powers, he would take an "Underdog Energy Vitamin Pill". This pill was first introduced in episode 9.  He keeps one of these pills inside a special ring he wears at all times. (Before taking one, he would often utter the words: "The secret compartment of my ring I fill / With an Underdog Energy Vitamin Pill.") Several episodes, starting with RiffRaffville, show Underdog without his ring and being powerless, since he must take another pill as his super powers begin to fail ("Without my Energy Vitamin Pill / I grow weaker and weaker and weaker still.") and, as a result, he can die; but of course, this being a children's cartoon show, no one actually kills him, even when he is at their mercy. He tells everyone who will listen this secret of his super powers. When the series was syndicated in the 1980s and 1990s, the scenes of him taking his energy pill were edited out. In the recent release Underdog: The Ultimate Collection, the word "Energy" was replaced with "Vitamin".

Underdog is shown to have incredible superhuman powers. However, the number and scope of his superpowers are inconsistent from episode to episode, being subject not only to the conventions of superhero comics, but also to the conventions of humorous cartoons. In one episode, he easily moved planets, safely butting against them with his rear end. In another episode, his Super Energy Pill, diluted billions of times when added to a city's water system, was capable of giving normal humans who drank the water enough strength to easily bend thick steel bars. Among his many powers shown on the show are: super strength, super speed, supersonic flight, physical invulnerability, X-ray vision, super breath, cosmic vision, atomic breath, atomizing eyes, heat vision, ultrasonic hearing, a supersonic high-pitch hi-fi voice and a great calculating brain.

Other media

Books and comics
 Underdog has also appeared in one Little Golden Book, Underdog and the Disappearing Ice Cream in 1975.
 Charlton Comics produced a comic book that ran 10 issues from July 1970 to January 1972, mainly adapting stories from the cartoon.
 Gold Key Comics produced a comic book that ran 23 issues from March 1975 to February 1979. Unlike the Charlton run, these featured original stories.
 Spotlight Comics did three issues in 1987.
 Harvey Comics did a one-shot in 1993, and a five-issue series from November 1993 to July 1994. These issues reprinted comics from the Charlton Comics run.
 American Mythology Comics produced a comic book that ran four issues from September 2017 to September 2018. It was followed by a Halloween ComicFest one-shot in 2019 and Underdog in Space which ran for one issue in 2020. Underdog: 1975 reprinted comics from the Gold Key Comics run.

Theme song
The show is also remembered for its title song, "Underdog," which was arranged and produced by Robert Weitz, with lyrics by Chester Stover, W. Watts Biggers, Treadwell Covington, and Joseph Harris. Several notable covers of the theme song have been made.  The original
song was sung by Robert Ragaini. He explained, "As a struggling singer in New York, I'd gotten a job singing a theme song for a newly proposed TV cartoon series named 'Underdog." I went to the studio, I think "O.D.O." on West 54th Street, sang as part of the backup group (ah-ooo, ah-ooo), then quickly sang the theme song over the track and left. I remember how pleased I was that I'd taken that mouthful of words and made them understandable. Oh yes, they paid me 50 dollars. No contract - I wasn't yet a member of SAG - and I was thrilled to get it. Until I heard it again, year after year. By then I'd become a successful jingle singer and I knew what I should have been making. When it came out as the music track of a Reebok commercial I filed a claim with the Screen Actors Guild, but of course I had no documentation. A friend did give me an Underdog T-shirt. I wore it once, but when a man I passed on West 14th Street started singing the song, I retired it."
 The Butthole Surfers released a version included on the 1995 tribute album Saturday Morning: Cartoons' Greatest Hits, produced by Ralph Sall for MCA Records.
 Ted Kooshian's Standard Orbit Quartet included the song on their 2009 CD Underdog, And Other Stories...
 An extended a cappella version was done by The Blanks on the TV program Scrubs during the episode titled "My Hero". They later recorded it on their 2004 album Riding the Wave.
 The hip hop producer and Wu-Tang Clan member RZA sampled the show's theme song in the group's 1993 song titled "Wu-Tang Clan Ain't Nuttin To F' Wit," released on their debut album Enter the Wu-Tang (36 Chambers).
 The Underdog theme also was used in a commercial for the Reebok ZQuick shoes in 2014.

VHS releases
In 1990, generic company UAV Corp. released Underdog in separate episodes, which went out-of-print in 1995. On June 14, 1996, Sony Wonder released Underdog on VHS in region 1 in a four-volume collection. These sets were reissued on the same format on September 12, 2000, as each set, especially the DVD versions, included a coupon for the Underdog lithograph by the series’ creator, Joe Harris.

DVD releases
Sony Wonder released Underdog Collector’s Edition DVD on September 12, 2000, and again on August 6, 2002, which these releases were discontinued in the mid 2000s. On July 24, 2007, Classic Media released Underdog on DVD in region 1 in a three-volume collection, following a previous three-volume set released in the late 1990s. Each volume features six digitally remastered and uncut, original broadcast episodes, each featuring two Underdog segments alongside additional cartoons from the Total TV library.

On February 21, 2012, Shout! Factory (under license from Classic Media) released a 9-disc Complete Series set containing new bonus material, including commentaries. According to Shout! Factory, "they're rebuilding the shows to their original television airing as best as they can".

Film adaptation

In 2005, Variety reported that a live-action Underdog motion picture was in development. As announced, the story introduces "a diminutive hound named Shoeshine [who] gets superpowers after a lab accident. When he's adopted by a 15-year-old boy, the two form a bond around the shared knowledge that Shoeshine is really Underdog." Actor Peter Dinklage was cast to play Simon Bar Sinister, while Alex Neuberger was cast to play Underdog's human companion, Jack Unger. The movie started filming in Providence, Rhode Island, in March 2006 and was released on August 3, 2007. The film was distributed by Buena Vista Pictures Distribution. Shoeshine/Underdog, voiced by Jason Lee, was played by a golden beagle named Leo sporting a red sweater and a blue cape. The film got mostly negative reviews, despite grossing $65.3 million worldwide.

Radio
In 1999, Biggers created a new episode of Underdog as a half-hour radio show narrated by veteran Boston newsman Tom Ellis with new original music composed by Biggers. Radio stations were asked to participate in Biggers' Victory Over Violence organization by airing the adventure in which the evil Simon Bar Sinister develops a Switchpitch baseball to turn positive people negative. His attempt to become king of Boston is foiled by Underdog (played by Biggers) and Sweet Polly Purebred (portrayed by Nancy Purbeck).

International broadcast

See also

 List of anthropomorphic animal superheroes
 List of Underdog characters
 Suzanne Muldowney

References

Further reading
Mark Arnold. Created and Produced by Total Television Productions. BearManor Media, 2009. 

W. Watts Biggers and Chet Stover. How Underdog Was Born. BearManor Media, 2016.

External links

 Underdog at Don Markstein's Toonopedia. Archived from the original on September 1, 2015.
 
 

1960s American animated television series
1960s American comic science fiction television series
1970s American animated television series
1970s American comic science fiction television series
1964 American television series debuts
1973 American television series endings
American children's animated action television series
American children's animated adventure television series
American children's animated comic science fiction television series
American children's animated superhero television series
Animated television series about dogs
Parody superheroes
NBC original programming
CBS original programming
General Mills
Gold Key Comics titles
Charlton Comics titles
Harvey Comics titles
Superhero comics
Adventure comics
Humor comics
Total Television
Dog superheroes
Television shows adapted into comics
Television series by Universal Television
DreamWorks Classics
Television shows about drugs
American superhero comedy television series
English-language television shows